Kate Atkinson  (born 20 December 1951) is an English writer of novels, plays and short stories. She is known for creating the Jackson Brodie series of detective novels, which has been adapted into the BBC One series Case Histories. She won the Whitbread Book of the Year prize in 1995 in the Novels category for Behind the Scenes at the Museum, winning again in 2013 and 2015 under its new name the Costa Book Awards.

Early life
The daughter of a shopkeeper, Atkinson was born in York, the setting for several of her books. She studied English literature at the University of Dundee, gaining her master's degree in 1974. Atkinson subsequently studied for a doctorate in American literature, with a thesis titled "The post-modern American short story in its historical context". She failed at the viva (oral examination) stage. After leaving the university, she took on a variety of jobs, from home help to legal secretary and teacher.

Writing career
Her first novel, Behind the Scenes at the Museum, won the 1995 Whitbread Book of the Year and went on to be a Sunday Times bestseller.  Since then, she has published further novels, as well as plays and short stories.
Some of her books are part of a series of novels, starting with Case Histories, which feature the character of Jackson Brodie as a private investigator and former police inspector. 
Atkinson has criticised the media's coverage of her work when she won the Whitbread award, for example, it was the fact that she was a "single mother" who lived outside London that received the most attention. In a 2018 interview she declared that she did not spend time in great literary parties or the London high life.

In 2009, she donated the short story "Lucky We Live Now" to Oxfam's Ox-Tales project, four collections of UK stories written by 38 authors. Atkinson's story was published in the Earth collection.

In March 2010, Atkinson appeared at the York Literature Festival, giving a world-premier reading from an early chapter from her novel Started Early, Took My Dog (2010), which is set mainly in the English city of Leeds.

Atkinson was appointed a Member of the Order of the British Empire (MBE) in the 2011 Birthday Honours for services to literature. On 30 November 2018, she was the guest on BBC Radio 4's Desert Island Discs.

Bibliography

Novels
Behind the Scenes at the Museum (1995) winner of the 1995 Whitbread first novel and Book of the Year Prize
Human Croquet (1997)
Emotionally Weird (2000)
Life After Life (2013)winner of the 2013 Costa novel award
A God in Ruins (2015)winner of the 2015 Costa novel award
Transcription (2018)
 Shrines of Gaiety (2022)
The Line of Sight (TBC)

Novels featuring Jackson Brodie
Case Histories (2004)
One Good Turn (2006)
When Will There Be Good News? (2008)
Started Early, Took My Dog (2010)
Big Sky (2019)

Plays
Nice (1996)
Abandonment (2000)

Story collections
Not the End of the World (2002)

Television adaptations
The first four Jackson Brodie novels have been adapted by other writers for the BBC under the series titled Case Histories, featuring Jason Isaacs as Brodie.

In 2015 in the United States, Shonda Rhimes was in the process of developing a pilot called The Catch, based on a treatment written by Atkinson, and starring Mireille Enos.

Her 2013 novel Life After Life was screened as a BBC drama of the same name in 2022, with Thomasin McKenzie in the role of Ursula.

Awards and honours
1995 Whitbread Awards (Book of the Year), Behind the Scenes at the Museum 
2009 Crime Thriller Award for The CWA Gold Dagger: When Will There Be Good News? (nominated)
2009 British Book Awards, Richard and Judy Bookclub Winner, When Will There Be Good News?
2013 Costa Book Awards (Novel category), Life After Life
2014 Walter Scott Prize shortlist for Life After Life
2014 South Bank Sky Arts Award for Life after Life
2015 Costa Book Awards (Novel category), A God in Ruins

Personal life
Atkinson has been married twice: while a student, to the father of her first daughter Eve, and subsequently to the father of her second daughter Helen.

Atkinson lived in Whitby, North Yorkshire, for a time, but now lives in Edinburgh.

See also

 List of British playwrights
 List of English novelists
 List of female detective/mystery writers
 List of people from Edinburgh
 List of people from York
 List of short story authors

References

External links

 
 
 One Good Turn Reviews at Metacritic
 
 
 Kate Atkinson talking about One Good Turn at MeetTheAuthor.co.uk
 John Mullan talks to Kate Atkinson about Behind the Scenes at the Museum for The Guardian Book Club podcast

1951 births
Living people
20th-century English novelists
20th-century English women writers
21st-century English novelists
21st-century English women writers
Alumni of the University of Dundee
British Book Award winners
English crime fiction writers
English short story writers
English women dramatists and playwrights
English women novelists
Fellows of the Royal Society of Literature
Members of the Order of the British Empire
Writers from Edinburgh
People from York
British women short story writers
Women mystery writers
20th-century British short story writers
21st-century British short story writers